Ivan Dodig and Austin Krajicek defeated Matthew Ebden and John Peers in the final, 6–3, 1–6, [10–8] to win the doubles tennis title at the 2022 Tennis Napoli Cup.

Dustin Brown and Andrea Vavassori were the reigning champions from 2021, when the tournament was an ATP Challenger Tour event, but only Vavassori chose to defend his title, partnering Lorenzo Sonego. Vavassori lost in the semifinals to Dodig and Krajicek.

Seeds

Draw

Draw

References

External links
 Main draw

Tennis Napoli Cup
Tennis Napoli Cup